Dmytro Babenko (born 28 June 1978) is a Ukrainian former footballer and current manager who is a goalkeeping coach at Veres Rivne.

External links 
 
 
 Official Website Profile

1978 births
Living people
Footballers from Luhansk
Ukrainian footballers
Association football goalkeepers
Ukrainian expatriate footballers
Ukrainian expatriate sportspeople in Lithuania
Expatriate footballers in Lithuania
FC Khimik Severodonetsk players
FC Hoverla Uzhhorod players
FC Zorya Luhansk players
FK Jonava players
FC Mynai players
Ukrainian Premier League players
Ukrainian First League players
Ukrainian Second League players
Ukrainian Amateur Football Championship players
A Lyga players
Ukrainian football managers